On Moonlight Bay is a 1951 American musical film directed by Roy Del Ruth which tells the story of the Winfield family at the turn of the 20th century. The movie is based loosely on the Penrod stories by Booth Tarkington. There was a 1953 sequel, By the Light of the Silvery Moon.

Plot
In a small Indiana town in the mid-1910s, the Winfield household have just moved into a larger house in a nicer neighborhood. The family includes: the father George, who is a banker, his wife Alice, their grown tomboyish daughter Marjorie (nicknamed “Margie”), their mischievous precocious trouble-making son Wesley, and their exasperated housekeeper Stella. No one but George is happy about the move, until Marjorie meets their new neighbor, William Sherman, home on a break from his studies at Indiana University. The two are immediately attracted to each other, which makes Margie change her focus from baseball to trying to become a proper young woman as perceived by society at the time.

Margie and Bill develop a romantic relationship despite, or perhaps because of, Bill's unconventional thoughts on life, including not believing in the institution of marriage or the role money plays in society.

The road to a happy life between Margie and Bill is hindered by distance (as Bill returns to school), Margie's attempts to learn perceived feminine things, her father’s disapproval and preference for another suitor, her brother’s continual meddling, and the U.S. entry into World War I.

Margie’s father softens when her brother breaks a window with their father’s old slingshot. This ultimately makes the father more receptive to her relationship with Bill and the movie reaches a happy ending.

Cast
 Doris Day as Marjorie Winfield
 Gordon MacRae as William "Bill" Sherman
 Jack Smith as Hubert Wakely
 Leon Ames as George Wadsworth Winfield
 Rosemary DeCamp as Alice Winfield
 Mary Wickes as the housekeeper Stella
 Ellen Corby as Miss Mary Stevens
 Billy Gray as Wesley Winfield
 James Dobson as Army sergeant
 Henry East as Doughboy by Train
 Jeffrey Stevens as Jim Sherman
 Eddie Marr as Contest Barker

Songs
 "On Moonlight Bay"
 "Cuddle Up a Little Closer"
 "Till We Meet Again"
 "Tell Me"
 "I'm Forever Blowing Bubbles"
 "Christmas Story"
 "Love Ya"
 "It's a Long Way to Tipperary"
 "Pack Up Your Troubles"

Reception
According to WB accounts, the film earned $2,738,000 domestically and $992,000 foreign.

Accolades
The film was nominated for the American Film Institute's 2006 list AFI's Greatest Movie Musicals.

References

External links

 
 
 
 
 Article at DorisDay.net

1951 films
1950s romantic musical films
1950s English-language films
Films based on works by Booth Tarkington
Films directed by Roy Del Ruth
Films scored by Max Steiner
Films set in Indiana
Films set in the 1910s
Warner Bros. films
American romantic musical films
American Christmas films
1950s American films